The blue-throated bee-eater (Merops viridis) is a species of bird in the bee-eater family. They are found throughout southeast Asia in subtropical or tropical mangrove forests. Their diet consists mostly of bees, wasps, and dragonflies. Blue-throated bee-eaters are small with colorful plumage consisting of a red nape, dark green wings, light green breast, and their signature blue throat. Juvenile plumage contain dark green head and wings and light green breasts, only developing their full plumage in adulthood. They have a rich variety of songs and calls, including longcalls which allow them to communicate long distances in the forest.

Blue-throated bee-eaters practice asynchronous brooding, which means that chicks hatch at different times, often pairing with siblicide. Older chicks are not only larger and able to withstand larger wounds from other siblings, but also have the ability to monopolize the food they are fed by parents. There has been several observations of migration between islands in southeast Asia or onto mainland of Asia. One notable seasonal spring migration occurs from Sumatra, across the Strait of Malacca, and ending on the west coast of Malaysia. They also migrate from southeast Asia to breeding grounds in western China during breeding season.

Conservation status of the blue-throated bee-eaters is of "least concern" due to their large distribution and stability of its population as of 2016. However, deforestation may be its biggest threat, destroying its habitat and decreasing other bird diversities.

Taxonomy and systematics
Blue-throated bee-eaters are part of the family Meropidae, which are the bee-eaters, including 27 other birds. Another alternate common name they have is the chestnut-headed bee-eater.

Description 
Adult blue-throated bee-eaters grow to around 21 cm, with an additional 9 cm including tail streamers. They weigh around 34 to 41 grams. Adults have spectacular plumage with a red crown and nape, dark green wings, blue tail, light green breast, white belly, and the signature blue throat. Juveniles develop their full plumage later, with mostly green coloration all over their body. They have a dark green head and wings and light green breast. Both adults and juveniles have black eye patches. Eye color can range between red and brown, or a combination.

Vocalizations 
Blue-throated bee-eaters make a combination of vocalizations characterized as longcalls, alarm calls, chirps, low chirps, purrs, sharp coos, trills, and feeding calls. Longcalls have been observed to communicate long distances and are recognizable by their volume and intensity. A longcall is performed either during flight or on a perch by stretching and pointing their bill upwards, known as a “longcall” posture. Chirps are short and sharp with regular intervals, often used during digs.

Distribution and habitat 
They have a wide distribution ranging from southeastern China to the Greater Sundas Islands. The most concentrated distribution is found in Singapore, Malaysia, southern Cambodia, and southern Thailand. Other locations with greater dispersal include Borneo and Java. They live in lower elevations between 0–670 meters. Their habitat includes a wide variety of flat plains, such as farmland, suburban gardens, riversides, dunes, and sandy clearings. In the winter, some blue-throated bee-eaters move to forest canopies and saltwater channels of mangrove forests. They often dig burrows horizontally into flat ground, allowing easier access compared to burrows in sand cliffs of other bee-eaters. Colony sizes range from 50 to 200 pairs or living completely solitary in the open country.

Behavior and ecology

Breeding 

Blue-throated bee-eaters have a generation rate of around 6.2 years. They practice asynchronous brooding, meaning parents begin brooding at different times. This results in hatching of chicks at different times. The eggs hatch over a period of ten days with an average spread of 4.43 ±12.15 days. The sequence and timing of the hatching of chicks is correlated with size, with the first-born chick having the greatest mass. Parents lay two to seven eggs with a survival of zero to three chicks raised to fledging. The chicks normally die in order, starting from youngest and smallest. The observed death rate in chicks was largely caused by sibling attacks by utilizing a sharp hook on the upper bill, later lost in development, and inflicting wounds on the naked head of other chicks. Those chicks who are older have time to grow more contour feathers, protecting them from damaging attacks. Siblicide is common among other birds to increase the larger and older chick's survival with greater access to food by the parents. Sibling attacks are more common among birds when food is scarce and monopolized. In the blue-throated bee-eater's case, insects are delivered one by one to the chicks, making food easily monopolized to chicks with the greater advantage. Increasing brood size did not increase the survival of the chicks. Decreasing body mass is correlated with increasing wounds and scars found on the individual chicks, which increased the likelihood of death.

Food and feeding 
They predominantly feed on flying insects such as bees and wasps. Other insects caught include flies, beetles, and other bugs up to 42mm. A large percentage of the blue-throated bee eater's diet consists of dragonflies with highest success rate of their catches in sunny conditions. Observations found no feeding activities during rain and right after showers. Their feeding patterns are well-matched with the seasonal weather patterns. The highest feeding rate is during breeding season, perfectly matching the sunniest period, right after the rainy season.

Migration 
Each spring, blue-throated bee-eaters (Merops viridis) along with blue-tailed bee-eaters (Merops philippinus) migrate from Sumatra, cross the Straits of Malacca, and end up on the west coast of Malaysia. The observed flight locomotion from Tanjung Tuan, west coast of Malaysia, was a combination of flapping and gliding flight. Occasionally, they would use the air currents from the sea-breeze to soar upwards. Once reaching land, they would rest on the lighthouse and tree branches for up to ten minutes before continuing eastward. This migration was observed from 2000 to 2001 with a total of 2,226 bee-eaters, with 1353 blue-tailed bee-eaters, 222 blue-throated bee-eaters, and the rest unidentified. The most observed migrating bee-eaters occurred on 21 March 2000 between 1-2PM. The high number observations of bee-eaters were most likely due to the strong thermals that formed over Sumatra, allowing them to soar over the sea-breeze with ease. High numbers of bee-eaters were also observed to migrate when there were high westerly winds blowing towards Malaysia. Blue-throated bee-eaters also migrate onto breeding grounds of western China during breeding season as shown in the range map above.

Relationship to humans 
Humans act as a threat to blue-throated bee-eater habitats. They have been characterized as "least concern" in terms of conservational status, which is determined by a combination of range distribution, population stability, habitat loss, and potential threats. This was last assessed on October 1, 2016. humans have impacted avian richness in the hill dipterocarp tropical rainforests in Malaysia. Logging and destruction of rainforests can impact not only individual bird species, but also the diversity of birds in the region. Diversity of species can bounce back within thirty years post-logging and was observed to have higher species richness in terms of bird diversity and numbers compared to recently logged forests.

Although uncommon, they are sometimes kept as pets and used for horticulture.

References
Collar, N.J. 2011. Species limits in some Philippine birds including the Greater Flameback Chrysocolaptes lucidus. Forktail number 27: 29–38.

External links
Image at ADW 

blue-throated bee-eater
Birds of South China
blue-throated bee-eater
blue-throated bee-eater
Taxonomy articles created by Polbot
Southeast Asia
Birds of Southeast Asia